The 1931 season was the twentieth season for Santos FC.

References

External links
Official Site 

Santos
1931
1931 in Brazilian football